Linze is a town in Gaoyou, Yangzhou, Jiangsu.  , it has six residential communities and twenty-two villages under its administration.

References

Gaoyou
Township-level divisions of Jiangsu